Ivan Dornič is a Slovak professional ice hockey player in Slovakia recently with MHC Martin of the Slovak Extraliga. He was selected by the New York Rangers in the 6th round (176th overall) of the 2003 NHL Entry Draft.

Career statistics

Regular season and playoffs

International

References

External links

Living people
MHC Martin players
HC Slovan Bratislava players
New York Rangers draft picks
1985 births
Slovak ice hockey centres
Ice hockey people from Bratislava
Slovak expatriate ice hockey players in the United States
Slovak expatriate ice hockey players in the Czech Republic
Slovak expatriate ice hockey players in Germany
Slovak expatriate sportspeople in Denmark
Slovak expatriate sportspeople in Belarus
Slovak expatriate sportspeople in Austria
Slovak expatriate sportspeople in Poland
Slovak expatriate sportspeople in Romania
Slovak expatriate sportspeople in the United Arab Emirates
Expatriate ice hockey players in the United Arab Emirates
Expatriate ice hockey players in Romania
Expatriate ice hockey players in Poland
Expatriate ice hockey players in Austria
Expatriate ice hockey players in Belarus
Expatriate ice hockey players in Denmark